Gen 5 Fibre Channel is the marketing name for purpose-built, data center network infrastructure for storage that provides reliability, scalability and up to 16 Gbit/s performance adopted by Brocade, Emulex, and QLogic. The name was created to move away from speed-based naming to technology generation-based naming.

Brocade Gen 5 Fibre Channel
Brocade formally introduced the term "Gen 5 Fibre Channel" in a press release announcing Brocade Fabric Vision Technology. Brocade has a broad range of Gen 5 Fibre Channel platforms spanning from director-class switches (Brocade DCX 8510), to fixed-port switches (Brocade 6520/6510/6505), to embedded switches, and adapters (Brocade 1860 Fabric Adapter).

Brocade platforms with Gen 5 Fibre Channel  are positioned for high-density server virtualization, cloud architectures, and next generation flash and SSD storage.

Emulex Gen 5 Fibre Channel

Emulex first introduced Gen 5 Fibre Channel in a press release announcing ecosystem and partner adoption of Gen 5 Fibre Channel HBAs for flash storage and SAN appliances. In conjunction, the Emulex LightPulse LPe1600B HBAs were re-positioned as "The PCI Express (PCIe) 3.0 LPe16000B Gen 5 Fibre Channel (16GFC/8GFC/4GFC) Host Bus Adapters"

QLogic Gen 5 Fibre Channel
QLogic first introduced Gen 5 Fibre Channel in during the Q1 2013 earnings call on July 25, 2013. In conjunction, the QLogic 2600 Series HBAs were repositioned as "2600 Series 16Gb Gen 5 Fibre Channel Adapters".

Cisco Gen 5 Fibre Channel
Cisco has not adopted the Gen 5 Fibre Channel branding.

Other sources adopting the Gen 5 Fibre Channel name
In an IDC Link report from March 26, 2013, analyst Ashish Nadkarni provided an assessment of Brocade's March 25 product launch 

Dell'Oro Senior Analyst Casey Quillin started using Gen 5 Fibre Channel in his Fibre Channel Switch reports starting in March 2013.

Gen 5 Fibre Channel Controversy
There have been heated debates within the industry about the usage of Gen 5 Fibre Channel as the marketing name for 16 Gbit/s Fibre Channel. After Emulex launched their rebranded HBAs with the Gen 5 Fibre Channel branding, the Register's Chris Mellor captured this debate in an article about the controversy. Since the article was posted, QLogic began using the Gen 5 Fibre Channel name as well.

References 

Fibre Channel
Storage area networks